South Naknek Airport , also known as South Naknek Nr 2 Airport, is a state-owned public-use airport located one nautical mile (1.85 km) southwest of the central business district of South Naknek, in the Bristol Bay Borough of the U.S. state of Alaska.

As per Federal Aviation Administration records, this airport had 330 commercial passenger boardings (enplanements) in calendar year 2008, a decrease of 19% from the 409 enplanements in 2007. South Naknek Airport is included in the FAA's National Plan of Integrated Airport Systems (2009-2013), which categorizes it as a general aviation facility.

Facilities and aircraft 
It has two runways: 4/22 is 2,264 by 60 feet (690 x 18 m) with a gravel surface; 12/30 is 3,314 by 60 feet (1,010 x 18 m) with a gravel and dirt surface.

For the 12-month period ending December 31, 2008, the airport had 3,530 aircraft operations, an average of 294 per month: 94% air taxi and 6% general aviation.

Airlines and destinations

References

External links 
 Airport diagram for South Naknek NR 2 (WSN) (GIF). FAA, Alaska Region. 5 Aug 2004.

Airports in Bristol Bay Borough, Alaska